The Israel Meteorological Service (HaSherut HaMete'orologi HaYisra'eli) is a unit of the Israeli Ministry of Transportation that is responsible for forecasting weather, meteorological data supply and climate research in Israel. Its origins begin in the 1930s in a meteorological unit established by the British Mandate government mainly as a support to the evolving aviation needs at the time. After establishment of the state of Israel, it was incorporated into the newly established ministry of transport. It is a member of the World Meteorological Organization since 1949. the Israeli Meteorological Service runs more than 150 measuring stations across Israel. Located between Rishon LeZion, Mishmar HaShiva, and Holon, it is traditionally identified with also nearby Beit Dagan.

External links 
  Israeli Meteorological Service
 Facebook
 Instagram

Atmospheric dispersion modeling
Governmental meteorological agencies in Asia
Research institutes in Israel